Jankov is a municipality and village in České Budějovice District in the South Bohemian Region of the Czech Republic. It has about 400 inhabitants.

Administrative parts
The village of Holašovice is an administrative part of Jankov.

Sights
Holašovice is a small historic village, since 1998 designated as a UNESCO World Heritage Site because of its exceptional preservation of a traditional Baroque-era village.

References

Villages in České Budějovice District